Matsuo Station is the name of three train stations in Japan:

 Matsuo Station (Chiba)
 Matsuo Station (Mie)
 Matsuo Station (Nagasaki)

It may also refer to:
 Matsuo-taisha Station, formerly called Matsuo Station